Kakkomi Dam  is a gravity dam located in Hokkaido Prefecture in Japan. The dam is used for power production. The catchment area of the dam is 941.8 km2. The dam impounds about 152  ha of land when full and can store 17410 thousand cubic meters of water. The construction of the dam was started on 1953 and completed in 1955.

References

Dams in Hokkaido